Upton Hall School FCJ is a catholic girls' grammar school with academy status located in Merseyside, England. It was founded in 1849 by the Faithful Companions of Jesus (FCJ).

Admissions
It is one of four Catholic schools in the Metropolitan Borough of Wirral. The school is located within the Catholic Diocese of Shrewsbury. It was awarded 'Outstanding' by Ofsted in 2006, 2012 and again in 2022. The school holds Training School status.

History
It was founded as a girls' convent school by Nuns of the Society of the Faithful Companions of Jesus (FCJ) in 1862.

The remains of Marie Madeleine, the founder of the FCJ, were reburied in the school's personal graveyard in 1904 due to anti-clerical tensions in France. Her body was moved to Kent in 1980, and subsequently to Paris in 2012.

Alumni
 Berlie Doherty, children's books author, and playwright, twice winner of the Carnegie Medal
 Charlotte O'Conor Eccles, Irish writer
 Sally Nugent, sports reporter on BBC Breakfast and BBC News channel
 Wendy Piatt, Director General since 2007 of the Russell Group
 Niamh Charles, Professional Footballer

Former teachers
 Angela Topping, poet
 Mavis Blackburn, Artist

See also 
 Bellerive FCJ Catholic College
 Diocese of Shrewsbury
 St Anselm's College, Birkenhead
 Upton Court Grammar School

References

Sources 
 http://www.uptonhall.wirral.sch.uk/
 https://web.archive.org/web/20070409004554/http://www.specialistschools.org.uk/
 http://www.fcjsisters.org/

External links 
 Upton Hall School FCJ
 History of Upton Hall School FCJ
 Faithful Companions of Jesus, English
 Diocese of Shrewsbury
 Wirral Learning Grid
 Specialist Schools and Academies Trust

Upton Hall School FCJ
St Anselm's College, Birkenhead
Girls' schools in Merseyside
1849 establishments in England
Catholic secondary schools in the Diocese of Shrewsbury
Academies in the Metropolitan Borough of Wirral
Training schools in England